Shamao Mountain, also called Mount Shamao, is a mountain located in Yangmingshan, in Beitou District, Taipei, Taiwan. Located on the Tatun Volcano Group, it stands at 643 m and a parasitic volcano of Qixing Mountain. Shamao Mountain is a round volcanic dome that looks like a black gauze cap. As the lava was more viscous when the mountain was formed, it gradually became a tholoid.

References

Volcanoes of Taiwan
Mountains of Taiwan
Dormant volcanoes
Landforms of Taipei